Mathieu Marineau (born ) is a Canadian male weightlifter, competing in the 85 kg category and representing Canada at international competitions. He competed at world championships, most recently at the 2013 World Weightlifting Championships.

Major results

References

1990 births
Living people
Canadian male weightlifters
Place of birth missing (living people)
Weightlifters at the 2010 Commonwealth Games
Weightlifters at the 2011 Pan American Games
Pan American Games competitors for Canada
Commonwealth Games medallists in weightlifting
Commonwealth Games bronze medallists for Canada
Weightlifters at the 2018 Commonwealth Games
20th-century Canadian people
21st-century Canadian people
Medallists at the 2010 Commonwealth Games